David Edmonds (10 November 1907 – 6 January 1950) was a New Zealand cricketer. He played eleven first-class matches for Auckland as a wicket-keeper between 1933 and 1947. 

In January 1950, while living in the Auckland suburb of Balmoral and working as a machinist, Edmonds was found at his home suffering from carbon monoxide poisoning. He was taken to hospital and died there a few hours later. His death was recorded as suicide.

See also
 List of Auckland representative cricketers

References

External links
 

1907 births
1950 suicides
New Zealand cricketers
Auckland cricketers
Cricketers from Auckland
Suicides in New Zealand
Suicides by carbon monoxide poisoning